The Bonin or Ogasawara Islands (Ogasawara Guntō) are a Japanese archipelago of over 30 subtropical and tropical islands located around  SSE of Tokyo and  northwest of Guam. The group as a whole has a total area of  but only two of the islands are permanently inhabited, Chichijima and Hahajima. Together, their population was 2560 as of 2021. Administratively, Tokyo's Ogasawara Subprefecture includes the Volcano Islands and the Self-Defense Force post on Iwo Jima. The seat of government is Chichijima.

Because of the Bonins' isolation, many of their animals and plants have undergone unique evolutionary processes. It has been called "the Galápagos of the Orient" and was named a natural World Heritage Site in 2011. When first reached during the early modern period, the islands were entirely uninhabited, the source of the name "Bonin". Subsequent research has found evidence of some prehistoric habitation by Micronesians. Upon their repeated rediscoveries, the islands were largely ignored by the Spanish, Dutch, and isolationist Japanese until finally being claimed by a passing British captain in 1827. American, European, and Hawaiian colonists arrived from the Kingdom of Hawaii in 1830. Subsequently, Meiji Japan successfully colonized and reclaimed the islands in 1875 but the original multicultural community continued up to World War II, when most islanders were forcibly relocated to Honshu. Following Japan's defeat, the US Navy occupied the island, bulldozing existing Japanese homes and restricting resettlement until full control of the Bonins was returned to Japan in 1968. Ethnically, the island is now majority Japanese but remains unusually diverse, including a local creole known as Bonin English. Improved transportation has made agriculture more profitable and developed tourism, but the development required for an airport remains a contentious local issue.

Names
The name "Bonin Islands" comes from the Japanese word bunin (an archaic reading of  mujin), meaning "no people" or "uninhabited". Ogasawara Municipality (mura) and Ogasawara Subprefecture take their names from the Ogasawara Group. The  is also used as a wider collective term that includes other islands in Ogasawara Municipality, such as the Volcano Islands, along with three other remote islands (Nishinoshima, Minamitorishima, and Okinotorishima). Geographically speaking, all of these islands are parts of the Nanpō Islands.

History

Prehistory
At the end of the 20th century, prehistoric tools and carved stones were discovered on North Iwo Jima and Chichijima, establishing that the islands were previously home to at least some members of an unknown Micronesian people.

Early modern period
The first recorded visit by Europeans to the islands happened on 2 October 1543, when the Spanish explorer Bernardo de la Torre on the San Juan sighted Haha-jima, which he charted as Forfana. At that time, the islands were uninhabited. Japanese discovery of the islands occurred in Kanbun 10 (1670) and was followed by a shogunate expedition in Enpō 3 (1675). Shimaya Ichizaemon, the explorer at the order of the shogunate, inventoried several species of trees and birds, but after his expedition, the shogunate abandoned any plans to develop the remote islands.

In 1727, a rōnin, claimed that the islands were discovered by his ancestor , in 1593, (Tensho 20), and the territory was granted as a fief by Toyotomi Hideyoshi. However, investigation of the claim found that it was a fraud and the very existence of Sadayori was doubtful; as a punishment Sadato was exiled by the shogunate (1735).

The first published description of the islands in the West was brought to Europe by Isaac Titsingh in 1796. His small library of Japanese books included  by Hayashi Shihei. This book, which was published in Japan in 1785, briefly described the Ogasawara Islands.

These groups were collectively called Islas del Arzobispo (Archbishop Islands) in Spanish sources of the 18th–19th century. This name is most likely due to an expedition organized by the Arzobispo (Archbishop) Pedro Moya de Contreras, Viceroy of New Spain, to explore the northern Pacific and the islands of Japan. Its main objective was to find the long sought and legendary islands of   Rica de Oro (Rich in Gold), Rica de Plata (Rich in Silver) and the Islas del Armenio (Islands of the Armenian). After several years of planning and frustrated attempts the expedition finally set sail on 12 July 1587 commanded by Pedro de Unamuno. Even if it did revisit the Daitō Islands, already charted by Bernardo de la Torre in 1543, the expedition could not find the wanted islands after searching the positions where they were charted in contemporary references. Japanese maps at the time seem to have been rather inaccurate and therefore considered by some to be deliberately misleading. It is thought that this was an attempt to discourage colonization attempts by foreign nations. Frederick William Beechey used the Spanish name as late as 1831 and believed that the Japanese Boninsima referred to entirely different islands.

19th century
On 12 September 1824 American Captain James Coffin in the whaler  first visited the southern group of islands (Coffin Islands). He visited the archipelago again in 1825 but this time he arrived at the middle group of islands (Beechey Group).

In September 1825, the British whaling ship Supply landed in the southern Bailey Group of islands. In 1826, another British whaler, William, arrived at Beechey Island. Whaling ships called on a regular basis, for water and turtles, before continuing their voyages.

In 1827 Captain F. W. Beechey of  reached the island chain and claimed them as a British possession. A copper plate was removed from Blossoms hull and left on a beach as a marker of the claim:

He also named the island of Chichijima "Peel" after then British Home Secretary Sir Robert Peel. Beechey was also surprised to find two men living on the islands. They remained on the islands after the William left the year before in 1826. The men were Wittrein and Petersen.

In 1830, with the help of British Consul to the Sandwich Islands (Hawaii) Richard Charlton, Richard Millichamp, and Matteo Mazzaro sailed to the islands. The first permanent colony was made up of  Nathaniel Savory of Bradford, Massachusetts, America, Richard Millichamp of Devon, England; Matteo Mazzaro of Ragusa/Dubrovnik, Austrian Empire (now in Croatia); Alden B. Chapin and Nathaniel Savory of Boston; Carl Johnsen of Copenhagen; as well as seven unnamed men and 13 women from the Kingdom of Hawaii. They found the climate suitable for farming and the raising of livestock. Rum was made from cane sugar, and bordellos were opened, sometimes staffed by women kidnapped from other island chains. Whalers and other ships that could not find another friendly port in Japan often visited the Bonins for provision and recreation.

Two years later the Oriental Translation Fund of Great Britain and Ireland published a posthumous, abridged publication of Titsingh's French translation of Sankoku Tsūran Zusetsu.

Further settlers arrived in 1846, aboard the whaling ship Howard. They established themselves initially in South Island. (One of them, a woman from the Caroline Islands named Hypa, died in 1897 age about 112, after being baptized on her deathbed.)

Commodore Matthew C. Perry of the United States Navy visited the islands in 1853 and bought property at Port Lloyd from Savory for $50. The US "Colony of Peel Island" (Chichijima) was created and Savory was appointed governor.

In January 1862 (Bunkyū 1), the Tokugawa shogunate of Japan claimed the islands in a short-lived colonial enterprise. The shogunal steamboat Kanrin Maru was dispatched to the islands with a crew of cartographers, physicians and prominent bureaucrats. The islands were officially renamed Ogasawara, referring to the legendary Japanese discoverer from the late 16th century. This tentative colonization, however, did not last for long. In summer 1863, under foreign pressure, the shogunate ordered the evacuation of the islands.

In 1875 the Japanese Meiji government reclaimed the islands. The Japanese names of each island were resolved and 38 settlers from Hachijojima were sent the following year. In 1876 the islands were put under the direct control of the Home Ministry. Further foreign settlement was banned, and the government assisted settlers who wished to relocate there from mainland Japan. The islands' forests were also cut down for sugar cane production. Colonists largely segregated themselves in two different villages, one for the Americans and the other for the Japanese. Islanders of European and US ancestry were eventually granted Japanese nationality in 1882. Jack London visited the islands in 1893 and published an account of his sojourn.

20th century
Lionel Cholmondeley compiled a history of the islands over the course of several years. His work was published in London in 1915.

In 1917, 60–70 island people claimed ancestry among the 19th-century English-speaking settlers; however, in 1941, no Bonin people would acknowledge descent from these early colonists. The current residents include some who claim to be related to Nathaniel Savory. In the winter of 1920–1921, Russian Futurist painter David Burliuk lived in the Bonin Islands and painted several landscapes of the islands.

The islanders were relegated to an insignificant status up through the early Shōwa period. After Japan's attack on the American naval base at Pearl Harbor, English was banned on the Bonins, and Americans had to take on Japanese names. As fighting creeped closer to Japan during the later stage of the war, most inhabitants were forcibly evacuated to the mainland. There was a Japanese military base on Chichijima run by a Major , who was known for engaging in cannibalism and other acts on prisoners of war. The torpedo bomber of later American President George H. W. Bush crashed in the ocean near Chichijima. He ended up getting rescued by USS Finback and becoming the only one to ultimately survive. Eight other airmen downed near the islands were later executed and cannibalized by the Japanese soldiers. Matoba Sueo was eventually hanged for his crimes after the war. The Battle of Iwo Jima in 1945, one of the fiercest battles of World War II, was fought on a garrison island in this region of the Pacific.

Following Japan's surrender, the islands were controlled by the United States Navy for the next 23 years, which the Westerners referred to as "Navy Time." All residents except those descended from the original settlers and/or related to them by marriage were expelled, while pre-war inhabitants of White American or European, Micronesian or Polynesian ancestry were allowed to return. Vacant properties of exiled Japanese were bulldozed as part of the Navy's management of nuclear weapons on Chichijima. In 1956, the residents petitioned for American annexation of the islands but received no response. In 1968, without consulting them, the United States government returned the Bonins to Japanese control. The Americans could choose to either become Japanese nationals or to receive American citizenship and repatriate to the United States. Initially some 600 Japanese relocated to the islands, growing to about 2,000 by the end of the 20th century.

21st century
The Bonins were named a natural World Heritage Site on 24 June 2011.

Economy
Historically, the Bonin Islands consisted of subsistence farming with some exploitation of timber and grazing land for export to the mainland. With improved transportation, it has developed as a tourist destination, particularly for Japanese interested in scuba diving and ecotourism. Foreign tourists are also sometimes drawn both by the islands' remoteness and its unusually mixed local culture. Refrigeration has also allowed greater exporting of fruits and vegetables. Coffee bushes have also been recently introduced to some success.

There are also a number of government agencies involved with the islands. A  radio telescope is located in Chichijima, one of the stations of the very-long-baseline interferometry (VLBI) Exploration of Radio Astrometry (VERA) project, and is operated by the National Astronomical Observatory of Japan.

Geography and administration

The Bonin Islands consist of three subgroups. Their former names come from a variety of sources but their Japanese ones generally reflect a family:
 Muko-jima Group, formerly the Parry Group
Muko-jima
Yome-jima (嫁島), formerly Kater Island
Nakōdo-jima or Nakadachi-jima (媒島)
Kita-no-jima (北の島 or 北島)
Mae-jima, formerly The Ears
 Chichi-jima Group (父島列島 ), formerly the Beechey Group
Chichi-jima (父島), formerly the Main Island or Peel Island
Ani-jima (兄島), formerly Hog Island or Buckland Island
Otōto-jima (弟島), formerly North Island or Stapleton Island
Mago-jima (孫島 )
Higashi-jima (東島 )
Nishi-jima (西島 ), formerly Goat Island
Minami-jima (南島 ), formerly Knorr Island
 Haha-jima Group (母島列島 ), formerly the Baily Group or Coffin Islands
Haha-jima (母島), formerly Hillsborough Island
Mukō-jima (向島), formerly Plymouth Island
Hira-jima or Taira-jima (平島)
Ane-jima (姉島), formerly Perry Island
Imōto-jima (妹島), formerly Kelly Island
Mei-jima (姪島)

Although not part of the Bonins (Ogasawara-guntō) geographically, the nearby Volcano IslandsNishinoshima (Rosario Island), Okinotorishima (Parece Vela), and Minamitorishima (Marcus Island)are organized as part of Ogasawara municipality (小笠原村, Ogasawara-mura). Ogasawara itself is organized as a subprefecture of Tokyo. In Japanese, the geographical expression for the full range of the municipality is the "Ogasawara Archipelago" (Ogasawara-shotō) which in turn is sometimes calqued back into English as another meaning for "the Bonin Islands".

Geology 
The Bonin Islands are a part of the Izu–Bonin–Mariana Arc of Pacific islands. A fore arc, they lie above the subduction zone where the Pacific Plate slides beneath the Philippine Sea Plate. This began during the Eocene, simultaneously producing the deep Bonin Trench to the east about 50 million years ago and prolonged volcanic activity that created the islands on the west around 48 million years ago. The Bonins are mostly composed of an andesitic volcanic rock called boninite, rich in magnesium oxide, chromium, and silicon dioxide. They may represent the exposed parts of an ophiolite that has not yet been emplaced on oceanic crust.

The Volcano Islands are much younger and still geologically active. Iwo Jima is a dormant volcano characterized by rapid uplift and several hot springs. In November 2013, a new volcanic island formed offshore from Nishinoshima and eventually merged with it.

The islands are fringed with healthy coral reefs and have many small beaches.

Climate
The climate of the Bonin Islands range from a humid subtropical climate (Köppen climate classification Cfa) to tropical monsoon climate (Köppen climate classification Am).

The climate of Chichijima in is on the boundary between the humid subtropical climate (Köppen classification Cfa) and the tropical monsoon climate (Köppen classification Am). Temperatures are warm to hot all year round owing to the warm currents from the North Pacific gyre that surround the island. Rainfall is less heavy than in most parts of mainland Japan since the island is too far south to be influenced by the Aleutian Low and too far from Asia to receive monsoonal rainfall or orographic precipitation on the equatorward side of the Siberian High. The wettest months are May and September, while the driest months are January and February.

The easternmost island, Minamitorishima or Marcus Island, has a tropical savanna climate (Köppen classification Aw) with warm to hot temperatures throughout the year. The wettest months are July and August, while the driest months are February and March.

Ecology

Flora

Flora has evolved differently on each of the islands. The Bonin Islands are sometimes referred to as the Galápagos of the Orient. They form a distinct subtropical moist broadleaf forest ecoregion, the Ogasawara subtropical moist forests. The ecoregion has a high degree of biodiversity and endemism. The islands are home to about 500 plant species, of which 43% are endemic. The forests are of three main types:

Type I: Elaeocarpus–Ardisia mesic forest is found in the moist lowland areas with deep soils. Elaeocarpus photiniaefolius, Pisonia umbellifera, and Pouteria obovata are other important canopy species. These forests were almost completely destroyed by clearing for agriculture before 1945.
Type II: Distylium–Raphiolepis–Schima dry forest is found in drier lowland and upland sites with shallower soils. It is also a closed-canopy forest, with a  canopy composed mostly of Distylium lepidotum, Rhaphiolepis integerrima, Schima mertensiana, Pouteria obovata, and Syzygium buxifolium. The Type II forests can be further subdivided into:
Type IIa: Distylium-Schima dry forest occurs in cloudy upland areas with fine-textured soils. These forests contain many rare and endemic species, with Pandanus boninensis and Syzygium buxifolium as the predominant trees.
Type IIb: Raphiolepis-Livistona dry forest is found in upland areas with few clouds and rocky soils. Rhaphiolepis integerrima is the dominant tree species, along with the fan palm Livistona boninensis, Pandanus boninensis and Ochrosia nakaiana.
Type III: Distylium-Pouteria scrub forest is found on windy and dry mountain ridges and exposed sea cliffs. These forests have the highest species diversity on the islands. Other common shrubs are Myrsine okabeana, Symplocos kawakamii, and Pittosporum parvifolium.

These islands are home to the northernmost outliers of the palm genus .  is endemic and has been planted in mediterranean climates with success. Other unique species include , a plant related to similar species growing in Fiji and New Caledonia.

Fauna

The giant squid was photographed off the Bonins for the first time in the wild on 30 September 2004 and was filmed alive there in December 2006.

The range of the Bonin petrel extends beyond the Bonins themselves to other islands in the North Pacific. There are two restricted-range species of birds on the islands, the Japanese woodpigeon and the near-threatened Bonin white-eye, formerly known as the Bonin honeyeater. The Japanese woodpigeon was extirpated from the Iwo Island groups in the 1980s. The formerly endemic Bonin pigeon, Bonin thrush and Bonin grosbeak are now extinct.

A small bat, Sturdee's pipistrelle, is only known in one record and has not been seen since 1915. The Bonin flying fox, also called the Bonin fruit bat, is endemic to the islands. It is currently listed as endangered, and a survey published by the Ogasawara Office of Education in 1999 estimated their number at around 100.

The islands are also renowned for the many species of snails that are found across the islands, especially the  snails. Unfortunately, most of the native snails are now endangered or extinct because of introduced species and habitat loss.

Transportation

Water transport

The main port is Futami on Chichijima. Since 2016, the main line connecting the islands to the mainland is the Ogasawara Shipping Company. The number of monthly voyages varies, having fallen during the coronavirus epidemic.

The project was canceled in July 2005, however, due to rising fuel prices and cost overruns of ¥2 billion.

To get to Hahajima, one first travels to Chichijima and then crosses on the ferry Hahajima Maru.

Road transport
Ogasawara Village operates a bus service on Chichijima and elderly passengers may use a "silver pass". There is also a sightseeing taxi service, a rental car company, motorized scooter rental services, a bike rental service, and other amenities. Bringing one's own automobile onto the island is extremely difficult and costly.

Air transport
The Bonins have no airport. During severe accidents, illnesses, and other emergencies, a helicopter is dispatched from the Self-Defense Force post on Iwo Jima. The ShinMaywa US-1 seaplane from the SDF post at Iwakuni is used during visits by the Tokyo governor and other dignitaries and for any emergency requiring rapid transport back to Honshu.

For several decades, there has been talk of building a full airport. Sites on Chichijima and Anijima have both been mooted. Travel time to the mainland would be cut to around 2 hours, improving tourism and the provision of emergency services, and the national, regional, and local government have all supported the idea in theory. Projects have lagged, however, due to concerns about its economic feasibility and concerns that the proposed sites are homes to numerous valuable, rare, or endangered plant species. Some locals have greatly desired an airport, while a desire to keep the natural beauty of the islands untouched has prompted othes to work to block one. The issue is quite controversial on the islands.

On 26 June 2016, the Japanese minister of environment Tamayo Marukawa talked about airport construction on the Bonins after the meeting in Tokyo commemorating the 5th anniversary of their registration as World Natural Heritage. At a 27 July 2017 meeting with Ogasawara Village, the Tokyo Metropolitan Government announced that it was considering opening a regular air route between Tokyo and the Bonins using a proposed  runway that would be built on Chichijima. This would allow it to land propeller aircraft with up to 50 passengers. The Tokyo government said that construction would depend on future assessment of the impact on the natural environment and economic feasibility. Ogasawara Village supported the runway in preference to expanding either the current helicopter or seaplane access. In fiscal 2019, 490 million yen was included in the Japanese budget for a feasibility study and a survey on Chichijima to determine the best location to construct the runway. In August 2020, the Tokyo Metropolitan Government held a council during which it affirmed its desire to open an airport but claimed that it would not occur until 2030 at the earliest.

Demography, language, and education

In 2021, the Bonins had a total population of 2560, divided between Chichijima (2120) and Hahajima (440). Virtually all of the Bonin Islands' permanent inhabitants are Japanese citizens. This includes the significant proportion with ancestors from the United States, Europe, and other Pacific islands, who can often be distinguished by their physical features, family names spelled out with katakana, and adherence to Christianity. During and after the US military occupation of 1946–68, a small minority of islanders opted for US citizenship and/or emigrated from the islands. However, most islanders with non-Japanese ancestry now appear to be reassimilating with the ethnic Japanese majority.

Japanese is the common language. Because settlers from the United States, Europe and other Pacific islands preceded ethnic Japanese residents, an English-lexified pidgin which subsequently developed into a creole, known as Bonin English, Ogasawara Creole or Ogasawara Mixed Language, emerged on the islands during the 19th century. This was the result of Japanese being hybridised with island English, resulting in a mixed language that can still be heard.

The Ogasawara Village municipality operates public elementary and junior high schools, while Tokyo Metropolitan Government Board of Education operates Ogasawara High School.

Fictional references 
The Bonins have been referenced in a number of works of fiction. Bonin by Robert Standish describes itself as 'a novel', but claims 'this book is an accurate history of the Bonin Islands', based mainly on information from Nathaniel Savory's great-granddaughter, and includes descriptions of maltreatment of the Anglo-Polynesian population by the later Japanese settlers and authorities and a detailed map of the Chichijima group (on the back end-paper), including over 50 English place-names.

Chapter XVI of Jack London's autobiographical novel John Barleycorn says "This isolated group, belonging to Japan, had been selected as the rendezvous of the Canadian and American sealing fleets", and describes the drunken visit of a young sailor and his shipmates to the Bonin Islands.

In the television series The Super Dimension Fortress Macross, a fictional island in the chain, South Ataria Island (which would have laid at the southernmost position in the chain, surpassing Minami Iwo Jima), is the landing site of the SDF-1 Macross.

In the 1963 film Matango, a luxury yacht is set adrift and lands on an island. Upon approaching the island, one of the crew members shouts: "I wonder if it's the Bonin Islands?" The English subtitles for the film misspell Bonin "Bonan".

The 2017 anime film The Irregular at Magic High School: The Movie – The Girl Who Summons the Stars takes place on fictional islands in the Bonins.

Gallery

See also

 List of extreme points of Japan
 List of World Heritage Sites in Japan
 María de Lajara

References

Citations

Bibliography
 .
 .
 Teikoku's Complete Atlas of Japan, Tekoku-Shoin Co., Ltd. Tokyo 1990, 
 .
 
 Freeman, Otis Willard. (1951). Geography of the Pacific. New York: Wiley. 
 Hawks, Francis. (1856). Narrative of the Expedition of an American Squadron to the China Seas and Japan Performed in the Years 1852, 1853 and 1854 under the Command of Commodore M.C. Perry, United States Navy. Washington: A.O.P. Nicholson by order of Congress, 1856; originally published in Senate Executive Documents, No. 34 of 33rd Congress, 2nd Session. [reprinted by London: Trafalgar Square, 2005.  (paper)]
 .
 .
 .
 .
 Kublin, Hyman. (1947). The Bonin Islands, 1543–1875. PhD thesis, Harvard University, Cambridge, Massachusetts
 .
 Muroga, Nobuo. (1967). Geographical exploration by the Japanese. In: Friis, Herman R. (ed.): The Pacific Basin: A history of its geographical exploration. New York.
 
 Sewall, John S. (1905). The Logbook of the Captain's Clerk: Adventures in the China Seas, Bangor, Maine: Chas H. Glass & Co. [reprint by Chicago: R.R. Donnelly & Sons, 1995] 
 .

External links

 Ogasawara Village (Japanese)
 The Bonin (Ogasawara) Islands Language and Culture Site (no longer maintained, apparently as of 2001)
 Ogasawara Channel (Japanese)
 National Archives of Japan: The faked map of 1752 mentioned in Hiroyuki Tanaka's 1998 article.
 Tokyo Metropolitan Government, Ogasawara-mura: maps/photos
 Waseda University — Hayashi Shihei. (1785). 三国通覧図説 (Sangoku Tsuran Zusetsu)

 
Archipelagoes of Japan

Fuji-Hakone-Izu National Park
Islands of Tokyo
Ecoregions of Japan
World Heritage Sites in Japan
Archipelagoes of the Pacific Ocean